Coordination isomerism is a form of structural isomerism in which the composition of the coordination complex ion varies. In a coordination isomer the total ratio of ligand to metal remains the same, but the ligands attached to a specific metal ion change. Examples of a complete series of coordination isomers require at least two metal ions and sometimes more.

For example, a solution containing ([Co(NH3)6]3+ and [Cr(CN)6]3−) is a coordination isomer with a solution containing [Cr(NH3)6]3+ and [Co(CN)6]3−.

See also
Coordination complex#Isomerism – This type of isomerism arises from the interchange of ligands between cationic and anionic entities of different metal ions present in a complex.

References
Zumdahl, Steven. Chemistry. Fifth Edition, 2000.
Miessler, Tarr. Inorganic Chemistry. Fourth Edition, 2011.

Coordination chemistry
Isomerism